A tear dress is a long dress made of calico traditionally worn by Cherokee women.

References 

Cherokee culture
Dresses